Phylloblastia is a genus of foliicolous (leaf-dwelling) lichens in the family Verrucariaceae. The genus was circumscribed in 1921 by Finnish lichenologist Edvard August Vainio, with Phylloblastia dolichospora assigned as the type species.

Species

 Phylloblastia alvaroi 
 Phylloblastia bielczykiae  – Bolivia
 Phylloblastia blechnicola  – Australia
 Phylloblastia borhidii  – Tanzania
 Phylloblastia dispersa 
 Phylloblastia dolichospora 
 Phylloblastia excavata  – Australia
 Phylloblastia fortuita  – Europe
 Phylloblastia inconspicua  – Central America
 Phylloblastia inexpectata  – Europe
 Phylloblastia marattiae 
 Phylloblastia mucronata 
 Phylloblastia pocsii 
 Phylloblastia septemseptata 
 Phylloblastia triseptata 
 Phylloblastia verheyeniana  – Democratic Republic of the Congo

P. alvaroi, P. borhidii, P. dispersa, P. marattiae, P. mucronata,P. pocsii,P. septemseptata and P. triseptata were all species in the former genus of Pocsia.

References

Cited literature

Verrucariales
Eurotiomycetes genera
Lichen genera
Taxa described in 1921
Taxa named by Edvard August Vainio